Uvinul is the trade name of a number of UV absorbers:
Diethylamino hydroxybenzoyl hexyl benzoate (Uvinul A Plus)
Ethylhexyl triazone (Uvinul T 150)
Oxybenzone (Uvinul M 40) 
Octinoxate (Uvinul MC 80 (N))
Octocrylene (Uvinul N 539 T)
PEG-25 PABA (Uvinul P 25) 
Sulisobenzone (Uvinul MS 40)